"Eleven" is a song recorded by South Korean girl group Ive for their debut single album of the same name. It was released as the group's debut single on December 1, 2021, by Starship Entertainment in conjunction with the single album. Written and produced by Peter Rycroft (Lostboy), Lauren Aquilina, Ryan S. Jhun and Alawn with additional songwriting credits by Seo Ji-eum, "Eleven" is a dance-pop song that lyrically expresses the members' romantic feelings.

Commercially, "Eleven" peaked at number two on both the Gaon Digital Chart and K-pop Hot 100, and reached the top 20 on the standard charts in Singapore, Malaysia and Japan. Ive promoted the song with live performances on various weekly South Korean music programs, including Inkigayo, Music Bank and Show! Music Core.

Background and release
On November 2, 2021, Starship Entertainment announced Ive's debut, making them the first girl group to debut under the agency in five years since WJSN in 2016. On November 11, the group's promotion schedule was released, with their debut date set for December 1. On November 22, it was announced the group will debut with single album Eleven and lead single of the same name. Six days later, the music video teaser for "Eleven" was posted to YouTube; both the song along with its official music video was released on December 1, 2021.

Composition
"Eleven" was written by Seo Ji-eum along with Peter Rycroft (Lostboy), Lauren Aquilina, and Ryan S. Jhun, whilst production and arrangement was handled by the latter trio and Alawn, respectively. Musically, "Eleven" is a dance-pop song that utilizes oriental instrumentations in the introduction with repeated percussion rhythms and marimba melodies, while its lyrical content expresses "the heart of a girl who is in love". Teen Vogue wrote that "the song, which features a light but snappy percussive instrumental, bucks K-pop trends by slowing its pre-chorus down, ramping up anticipation before detonating its catchy chorus." In terms of musical notation, "Eleven" is composed in the key of A major, with a tempo of 120 beats per minute.

Critical reception
"Eleven" was met with generally positive reviews from music critics. Writing for webzine IZM, Jung Jeong-min complimented the track's production, particularly in the slow pre-chorus, and wrote that "overall, it is a debut single that exceeds expectations". All three music critics from webzine Idology gave the song a favorable review, where they highlighting its unique composition and the group's performance. "Eleven" was ranked number 15 on Papers list of 40 Best K-pop Songs of 2021, with editor Crystal Bell writing that "There's not a song on this list that has made as much of an impact in such a short amount of time as the enchanting debut single from rookie girl group IVE." Insider named it one of the best debut songs of all time in K-pop.

Commercial performance
"Eleven" debuted at number 96 on South Korea's Gaon Digital Chart in the chart issue dated November 28 – December 4, 2021; on its component charts, the song debuted at number 13 on the download chart and number 130 on the streaming chart. The song rose to number 4 on the Gaon Download Chart in the chart issue dated December 12–18, 2021. The song rose to number 3 on the Gaon Digital Chart and Gaon Streaming Chart in the chart issue dated January 16–22, 2022. On the Billboard K-pop Hot 100, it debuted at number 12 in the chart issue dated December 18, before rising to number 2 in the week of January 8, 2022.

In Japan, the song debuted at number 54 and number 50 on Billboard Japan Hot 100 and Top Streaming Songs, respectively, in the chart issue dated December 8, 2021. The following week, it rose to number 16 on the Japan Hot 100 and number 11 on the Top Streaming Songs chart. In Singapore, "Eleven" debuted at number 7 and number 1 on RIAS Top Streaming Chart and Top Regional Chart, respectively, in the chart issue dated December 3–9, 2021.

In the United States, the song debuted at number 12 on Billboard World Digital Songs in the chart issue dated week of December 11, 2021, before rising to number 9 the following week. Globally, the song debuted at number 68 on the Billboard Global 200 and at number 38 on the Global Excl. U.S. in the week of December 18, 2021.

Promotion
Prior to the single album's release, on December 1, 2021, Ive held a debut showcase to introduce Eleven along with its title track. The group subsequently appeared on several music programs for the first time: including KBS2's Music Bank on December 3, MBC's Show! Music Core on December 4, and SBS's Inkigayo on December 5. On the December 8 broadcast of MBC M's Show Champion, Ive received their first music program award for "Eleven", doing so a week after debut. The group followed up with appearances on SBS MTV's The Show on December 14, Show Champion on December 15, and Show! Music Core on December 18, where they won first place in all appearances. In 2022, the group performed on Show! Music Core on January 8, and Inkigayo on January 9, where they won first place in both appearances.

"Eleven -Japanese ver.-" was performed on the 73rd NHK Kōhaku Uta Gassen music program on New Year's Eve, 2022.

Credits and personnel
Credits adapted from Melon.

 Ive – vocals
 Seo Ji-eum – lyrics
 Peter Rycroft (Lostboy) – lyrics, composition, arrangement
 Lauren Aquilina – lyrics, composition, arrangement
 Ryan S. Jhun – lyrics, composition, arrangement
 Alawn – arrangement

Charts

Weekly charts

Monthly charts

Year-end charts

Accolades

Certifications

Release history

References

Ive songs
2021 songs
2021 singles
Starship Entertainment singles
Korean-language songs
Songs written by Ryan S. Jhun
Songs written by Peter Rycroft
Songs written by Lauren Aquilina